Helicobacter pametensis is a bacterium in the Helicobacteraceae family, Campylobacterales order. It was first isolated from bird and swine faeces. Its cells are motile and possess one subterminal sheathed flagellum at each end.

References

Further reading

External links

LPSN
Type strain of Helicobacter pametensis at BacDive -  the Bacterial Diversity Metadatabase

Campylobacterota
Bacteria described in 1994